RSJ may refer to:

 Religious Sister of St Joseph, post-nominal by members of the Congregation of Sisters of Saint Joseph of the Sacred Heart
 Rock Street Journal, an Indian rock magazine
 Rolled steel joist or I-beam
 RSJ (band), a metalcore band from York, UK
Richard Speight Jr., an actor from Nashville, TN